Leslie A. Murphy was a Northern Irish goalkeeper who played in the English Football League for Leeds City, Wrexham, Bristol Rovers and Reading.

Career
Getting his start at Belfast Celtic in the 1910–11, Murphy would move to England to play for Leeds City, starting as first choice goalkeeper but lost his place to Cecil Reinhardt.

Only staying at Leeds for one season, he went to Irish club Glentoran, where he won the Irish League.

He stayed in Ireland until 1920, having a brief spell at Linfield, before signing with Wrexham. He held a first team spot before losing it when he contracted rheumatic fever.

In 1922 he moved to Bristol Rovers, and the next season he moved to Reading, where he retired.

International career
In 1912, during his time with Glentoran, Murphy represented the League of Ireland twice.

References

Year of birth missing
Year of death missing
Place of death missing
Association football goalkeepers
Association footballers from Northern Ireland
Belfast Celtic F.C. players
Leeds City F.C. players
Glentoran F.C. players
Linfield F.C. players
Wrexham A.F.C. players
Bristol Rovers F.C. players
Reading F.C. players